Matthew Clifford Luke (born February 26, 1971) is an American former outfielder and first baseman in Major League Baseball (MLB). He played for the New York Yankees, Los Angeles Dodgers, Cleveland Indians, and Anaheim Angels between 1996 and 1999.

Career

Amateur
A native of Long Beach, California, Luke attended college at the University of California, Berkeley, and in 1991 he played collegiate summer baseball with the Hyannis Mets of the Cape Cod Baseball League. He was selected by the New York Yankees in the 8th round of the 1992 Major League Baseball draft.

Professional
After five years pitching in the minor leagues for the Yankees organization, Luke made his MLB debut in 1996 and played for the Yankees for one game before returning to the minors, playing there through 1997. He also played for the Los Angeles Dodgers, Cleveland Indians, and Anaheim Angels. Luke played what would be his final major league game on September 30, 1999, with the Angels. He finished his Major League career with a career .242 batting average, 15 home runs, and 40 runs batted in. After the 1999 season, he signed with the Milwaukee Brewers but did not play during the 2000 season. In 2001, Luke played for the Long Beach Breakers of the Western Baseball League. In 2002, he played for the Durham Bulls, then AAA affiliates of the Tampa Bay Devil Rays and the Piratas de Campeche of the Mexican League.

Personal
Luke presently resides in Orange County, California.  After graduating from El Dorado High School, Luke went on to attend college at UC Berkeley.  He is a member of Yorba Linda Friends Church and the Fellowship of Christian Athletes.  As of 2011, Luke owns his own real estate company, Matt Luke Home Team, where he also works as a real estate broker/agent.  He also is a member of the Los Angeles Dodgers organization serving as a speaker and representative of the Dodgers Legend Bureau and Community Relations team.

References

External links

1971 births
Living people
Albany-Colonie Yankees players
American expatriate baseball players in Canada
Anaheim Angels players
Baseball players from Long Beach, California
California Golden Bears baseball players
Cleveland Indians players
Columbus Clippers players
Durham Bulls players
Edmonton Trappers players
Greensboro Hornets players
Hyannis Harbor Hawks players
Lake Elsinore Storm players
Long Beach Breakers players
Los Angeles Dodgers Legend Bureau
Los Angeles Dodgers players
Major League Baseball first basemen
Major League Baseball left fielders
Major League Baseball right fielders
New York Yankees players
Norwich Navigators players
Oneonta Yankees players
Tampa Yankees players